Sidi Mohammed ibn Nasir or Mohammed ibn Mohammed ibn Ahmed ibn Mohammed ibn al-Hussayn ibn Nasir ibn Amr abu Bakr al-Drawi al-Aghlabi (1603–1674) was a Moroccan Sufi and founder of the Nasiriyya zawiyya of Tamegroute. Sidi Muhammad bin Nasir was a theologian, scholar and physician, especially interested in mental disorders. He wrote several works of fiqh, some poetry, and hundreds of letters and treatises on Islamic law. He followed and extended the teachings of Shadhili and under his leadership the Nasiriyya became the "mother zawiya" of Sufism in the Maghreb with several branches in different parts of the country, including the zawiya of Irazan in the Sous valley where 500 students were financed by the brotherhood. The scholar Al-Yusi was one of his students and praised him in a well-known poem.

Bibliography
Al-Yusi, Index and Muhadarat 
Mohammed ibn at-Tayyib al-Qadiri, Nashr al-Mathani 
Mohammed as-Saghir al-Ifrani al-Marakkushi, As-Safwa 
Muhammad ibn Jaafar al-Kittani, Salwa al-Anfas 
Mohammed ibn Musa ibn Nasir (1179 AH), The Inlaid Pearls on the Righteous Men of Draa

References

Moroccan letter writers
Moroccan travel writers
Moroccan Sufi writers
Moroccan psychiatrists
Berber writers
17th-century Moroccan physicians
1603 births
1674 deaths
17th-century Moroccan writers
People from Tamegroute

Berber scholars
17th-century Berber people